The leaf-nose leg skate (Springeria folirostris) is a species of ray in the family Anacanthobatidae, native to depths of  in the Gulf of Mexico. It was originally described in the genus Springeria, but this was later considered a subgenus of Anacanthobatis. In 2016 Springeria was again elevated to full genus status.

References

John D. McEachran and Katherine A. Dunn, Phylogenetic Analysis of Skates, a Morphologically Conservative Clade of Elasmobranchs (Chondrichthyes: Rajidae). Copeia, vol. 1998, no. 2, pp. 271–290.

External links
 Species Description of Springeria folirostris at www.shark-references.com

leaf-nose leg skate
Gulf of Mexico
Taxa named by Henry Bryant Bigelow
Taxa named by William Charles Schroeder
leaf-nose leg skate